In time series analysis, the cross-spectrum is used as part of a frequency domain analysis of the cross-correlation or cross-covariance between two time series.

Definition 
Then the cross-spectrum  is defined as the Fourier transform of  

 
where 
  .

The cross-spectrum has representations as a decomposition into (i) its real part (co-spectrum) and (ii) its imaginary part (quadrature spectrum)
 

and (ii) in polar coordinates
 
Here, the amplitude spectrum  is given by
 
and the phase spectrum  is given by

Squared coherency spectrum 
The squared coherency spectrum is given by
 

which expresses the amplitude spectrum in dimensionless units.

See also
 Cross-correlation
 Power spectrum
 Scaled Correlation

References

Frequency-domain analysis
Multivariate time series